Roman Onderka (born November 11, 1965, in Brno) is a Czech politician who has served as the Mayor of Brno, and has been a member of the Chamber of Deputies of the Czech Republic since October 2017, and a vice chairman of the Czech Social Democratic Party since 2018. On 25 October 2021 he became acting leader of ČSSD when Jan Hamáček resigned on the position.

References

Living people
1965 births
Politicians from Brno
Czech politicians
Leaders of the Czech Social Democratic Party
Czech Social Democratic Party mayors
Czech Social Democratic Party MPs
Brno University of Technology alumni
Members of the Chamber of Deputies of the Czech Republic (2017–2021)